Cameron Artis-Payne (born June 23, 1990) is an American professional football running back for the Montreal Alouettes of the Canadian Football League (CFL). He played college football at Auburn, and was drafted by the Carolina Panthers in the fifth round of the 2015 NFL Draft.

Early years
Artis-Payne attended Harrisburg High School in Harrisburg, Pennsylvania. He spent one year at Milford Academy in New Berlin, New York after graduating from high school.

College career
Artis-Payne attended Allan Hancock College in 2011 and 2012. In two seasons, he rushed for 3,412 yards and 43 touchdowns, earning CCCAA All-American and California juco player of the year. Artis-Payne transferred to Auburn University before the 2013 season. In his first year at Auburn, he rushed for 610 yards with six touchdowns as a backup to Tre Mason. Artis-Payne started his senior season in 2014 as Auburn's starter. In 13 games, he rushed for a conference-leading 1,608 yards on 303 carries with 13 rushing touchdowns, earning first-team All-SEC honors.

Collegiate statistics

Professional career

Artis-Payne was selected in the fifth round (174th overall) by the Carolina Panthers in the 2015 NFL Draft. In the 2015 season, he finished with 45 carries for 183 rushing yards and a touchdown.

On February 7, 2016, Artis-Payne's Panthers played in Super Bowl 50. In the game, the Panthers fell to the Denver Broncos by a score of 24–10. Artis-Payne was inactive for the game.

In the 2016 season, Artis–Payne finished with 144 rushing yards and two rushing touchdowns, which both came against the Tampa Bay Buccaneers on October 10. In the 2017 season, he finished with 95 rushing yards and a rushing touchdown. In the 2018 season, he had 19 carries for 69 yards and one rushing touchdown.

On March 28, 2019, Artis-Payne re-signed with the Panthers on a one-year deal. He was released during final roster cuts on August 30, 2019.

Dallas Renegades
Artis-Payne was drafted in the third round in the 2020 XFL Draft by the Dallas Renegades. During the 5 games played during the COVID-19 pandemic shortened 2020 season, Artis-Payne worked his way up from backup to starter, recording 241 rushing yards on 41 carries for over 5 yards per carry average, and 2 touchdowns, as well as 23 catches for 101 yards. Pro Football Focus named him one of their highest rated players by the time the season was over. He had his contract terminated when the league suspended operations on April 10, 2020.

Montreal Alouettes
Artis-Payne signed with the Montreal Alouettes of the CFL on February 23, 2021. Filling in for starting running back William Stanback, Artis-Payne rushed for 122 yards on 21 carries and scored a late touchdown against the Redblacks in Week 10 to secure the victory.

Statistics

References

External links
 Carolina Panthers bio
 Auburn Tigers bio 

1990 births
Living people
Players of American football from Harrisburg, Pennsylvania
American football running backs
Allan Hancock Bulldogs football players
Auburn Tigers football players
Carolina Panthers players
Dallas Renegades players
Montreal Alouettes players